The 2015 Supercopa de España was a two-legged football match-up that was played in August 2015 between Athletic Bilbao, runners-up of the 2014–15 Copa del Rey, and Barcelona, the champions of 2014–15 La Liga and the 2014–15 Copa del Rey, making it a rematch of the 2015 Copa del Rey Final.

Athletic Bilbao won the trophy 5–1 on aggregate for their first honour in 31 years.	
Aritz Aduriz scored a hat-trick for Athletic Bilbao in the first leg in a 4–0 win on 14 August. He added a fourth goal three days later in the second leg, which ended in a 1–1 draw at the Camp Nou.

Background
This was the 26th appearance of Barcelona in the Supercopa, more than any other club. For Athletic Bilbao, it was their fifth appearances in the competition. The duel between the two clubs in the Supercopa was the fourth, with Barcelona winning on all the three previous occasions.

Match details

First leg

Second leg

See also
2015–16 Athletic Bilbao season
2015–16 FC Barcelona season
Athletic–Barcelona clásico

References

2015–16 in Spanish football cups
FC Barcelona matches
Athletic Bilbao matches
2015